Joshua Adrian Kronfeld (born 20 June 1971) is a TV presenter and a former rugby union footballer who represented New Zealand at international level and Otago, the Highlanders and Leicester at first-class level. During his international career, Kronfeld played in 56 games for the All Blacks, gaining 54 test caps, including appearances at both the 1995 and 1999 Rugby World Cups.

Kronfeld played as an openside flanker, and his greatest attribute was considered to be the speed with which he was able to get to breakdowns in play, in order to gain or regain possession of the ball.  Kronfeld is an alumnus of Aquinas College, Dunedin, and is a grand-nephew of two All Blacks of the 1930s, brothers Dave and Frank Solomon.

Early life
Kronfeld was born in Hastings in Hawkes Bay, and attended Hastings Boys' High School.  Kronfeld described himself as "German-Samoan" and he is Jewish.
He played his early rugby union at scrum-half and centre, switching to flanker at high school.

In 1990 Kronfeld moved to Dunedin to study physical education at the University of Otago. Here he became involved in the Otago University Rugby Club. After playing one game in 1992, Kronfeld gained a starting position in the Otago team in the National Provincial Championship (NPC) for 1993. Kronfeld would eventually play 69 matches for Otago. He completed his BPhEd degree in 1993.

Rugby career

Kronfeld made his All Black test debut in 1995, playing against Canada at Eden Park in Auckland. He played in the 1995 Rugby World Cup including the final in which the All Blacks lost a thrilling game to South Africa.

After the inception of the Super 12 competition in 1996, Kronfeld also played for the Highlanders Super 12 franchise. In total, Kronfeld made 42 appearances for the Highlanders.

He made five appearances in the All Blacks’ 1999 World Cup campaign, which included the game against England and the amazing semi-final with France that took place at Twickenham.

Kronfeld remained a first choice player for Otago, the Highlanders and the All Blacks until 2000. At the end of the 2000 season, after 69 matches for Otago, 42 for the Highlanders in the Super 12 and 56 All Black matches including 54 tests, Kronfeld left New Zealand rugby to take up a lucrative contract with the English club, Leicester.  In May 2001 he officially signed with English club Leicester Tigers.

After an injury-hit start to the 2001-02 season Kronfeld recovered well, establishing himself as a regular first-team player. He was an unused replacement as Leicester won the 2002 Heineken Cup Final. He was twice voted by fans Player of the Month, once Zurich Premiership Player of the Month and then named by his Tigers colleagues as their Players' Player of the Season 2002-03.

In 2003, Kronfeld returned to New Zealand, and subsequently retired from first-class rugby.

Life After Rugby

Kronfeld has made numerous media appearances, e.g. Celebrity Treasure Island. He has also returned to the University of Otago to study physiotherapy.

In 2009 Kronfeld participated in the fifth season of TVNZ's entertainment series Dancing with the Stars.

From September to December 2012 Josh Kronfeld hosted the ChoiceTV show Brunch (New Zealand) for Season One with April Ieremia.

See also
List of select Jewish rugby union players

References

External links

1971 births
New Zealand rugby union players
New Zealand people of German-Jewish descent
New Zealand sportspeople of Samoan descent
New Zealand expatriate sportspeople in England
New Zealand international rugby union players
Leicester Tigers players
Highlanders (rugby union) players
Rugby union flankers
Jewish rugby union players
New Zealand Jews
People educated at Hastings Boys' High School
University of Otago alumni
Rugby union players from Hastings, New Zealand
Living people